The Sheffield–Lincoln line is a railway line in England.  It runs from Sheffield to Lincoln via Worksop, Retford and Gainsborough Lea Road.  The route comprises the main line of the former Manchester, Sheffield and Lincolnshire Railway (MS&LR), to Gainsborough Trent Junction, where it then follows the former Great Northern and Great Eastern Joint Railway (GNGEJR) to Lincoln Central. The former MS&LR main line  continues from Trent Junction to Wrawby Junction, Barnetby, much of it now single line, where it then runs to Cleethorpes.

Routes

Current services
The line comprises two passenger routes: the main line route from Sheffield to Lincoln and a branch line route running from Sheffield to Cleethorpes, using the Brigg branch line from Gainsborough Trent Junction. North of Gainsborough Central the Brigg branch line primarily carries freight trains to/from the Port of Immingham.

Main line route
The route largely follows the former MS&LR main line, until Trent Junction, Gainsborough where it goes on to follow the former GNGEJR line to Lincoln.
Sheffield
Darnall
Woodhouse
Kiveton Bridge
Kiveton Park
Shireoaks
Worksop
connections with Robin Hood Line
Retford
connections with ECML services at Retford
Joined by Doncaster-Lincoln Line at West Trent Junction.
Diverges from the former MSLR main line and joins the former GMGEJR line, now the main route line at East Trent Junction.
Gainsborough Lea Road
connections with Doncaster–Lincoln line
Saxilby
Lincoln Central

An hourly service provided by Northern runs along this route.
Additional services provided by East Midlands Railway serve the section between Lincoln and Gainsborough Lea Road en route to Doncaster.

Brigg branch line route
This route follows the former MS&LR main line to Cleethorpes. 
Sheffield
Darnall
Woodhouse
Kiveton Bridge
Kiveton Park
Shireoaks
Worksop
connections with Worksop–Nottingham line
Retford
connections with ECML services at Retford
Continues on the former MS&LR main line, now Brigg Branch Line, from East Trent Junction.
Gainsborough Central
Limit of regular hourly passenger services
Kirton Lindsey (served on Saturdays only)
Brigg (served on Saturdays only)
Joins the South Humberside Main Line (from ) and Grimsby–Lincoln–Newark line (from )
Barnetby
connections with South TransPennine route and Nottingham–Grimsby line
Joined by the Barton line (from )
Habrough
connections with Barton on Humber–Cleethorpes line
Grimsby Town
Cleethorpes

On weekdays and Saturdays an hourly service between Sheffield and Gainsborough Central is provided by Northern. This was introduced in the May 2019 timetable change and is the first regular weekday service to Gainsborough Central since 1993. Passenger services along the entire route only run on Saturdays, when Northern operates three services each way between Sheffield and Cleethorpes.

The Brigg Branch line is single from Barnetby to Brigg, and Kirton Tunnel to Thonock (North of Gainsborough Central) with a passing loop at Northorpe. Other sections are double track.

Former routes

Clarborough Junction-Sykes Junction branch
This Sheffield and Lincolnshire Junction Railway branch had originally been proposed in 1844. It opened on 7 August 1850

Services from Sheffield via the branch line to Lincoln, then continuing to Grimsby and Cleethorpes via Market Rasen, used to operate along the line. Opening of the line was delayed for four months by controversy over the safety of Torksey Viaduct. It is now a Grade II listed structure, though the line closed to passengers on 2 November 1959.

In 1967 the line was reopened from Clarborough Junction to Cottam to serve Cottam power stations and is now solely used for freight traffic. On reopening, Clarborough Junction signalbox was closed and control passed to Thrumpton, and the two level crossings were converted to automatic half barriers. The Thrumpton box was rebuilt in 2014.

With the closure of Cottam power station in 2019, the line has since remained disused with it. The final train to travel over this branchline was "The Cottam Farewell" railtour, which travelled over the line on 28 September 2019. The train line is still classed as "Live" despite no trains passing down the line since this date. Mandatory inspections and patrols still take place of which are done on foot, however there are no official plans to reopen the line for passenger or freight traffic as of March 2023.

Accidents and incidents
On 9 December 1983, a freight train collided at low speed with the side of a local passenger train at Wrawby Junction. The first carriage of the passenger train was derailed and turned over onto its side, and one passenger was killed instantly.
On 28 February 2007, an EWS freight train derailed at a set of points between Lincoln Central train station and Lincoln High Street level crossing. There were no injuries.
On 27 April 2012, a Northern Rail passenger train running the Lincoln-Adwick route derailed as it was leaving Clarborough Tunnel on the Retford side. This was due to a landslip onto the line. The driver and a passenger were taken to hospital with minor injuries.
4 December 2012, a Northern Rail Passenger train running a Scunthorpe-Lincoln route, struck and fatally injured a worker on the tracks near Saxilby.
On 30 June 2015, a DB Schenker freight train was derailed near the site of  station, on the Lincoln-Grimsby line.

Types of train
The line is operated by Northern Trains, which mainly utilises Class 150 sets (though Class 153 single railcars can also appear).  From Gainsborough Trent Junction (where the line from Doncaster joins) eastwards to Lincoln, class 153 and Class 156 units operated by East Midlands Railway share the route.  The Brigg route is also used by freight traffic between Immingham docks and the power stations at West Burton, Cottam (after reversing in Worksop sidings) and West Yorkshire & the East Midlands.

Retford dive-under
The Sheffield and Lincolnshire Junction Railway (S&LJR) (later Great Central Railway (GCR), now the Sheffield–Lincoln line) was the first railway in Retford, arriving on 6 July 1849. This flat crossing caused congestion as trains could not run on both lines at the same time; this was to become a bigger problem when the West Burton and Cottam power stations were built, as they would require 5 million imperial tons (approx. 5 million tonnes) of coal a year, to be sourced from the National Coal Board's coalfields in the East Midlands and North East. The flat crossing also placed a speed restriction on express trains using the GNR line.

In order to alleviate these problems a dive-under was constructed, by which the GCR passed under a new bridge which the GNR passed over. Construction started in 1963 and was completed in 1965. During construction, trains continued to use the flat crossing. Upon completion of the dive-under the flat crossing was finally removed on 13 June 1965, allowing through trains on the GNR to run at normal operating speeds, and allowing trains to run on both lines simultaneously.

References

Rail transport in Nottinghamshire
Rail transport in Lincolnshire
Rail transport in South Yorkshire
Rail transport in Sheffield
Lincoln, England
Railway lines in the East Midlands
Railway lines in Yorkshire and the Humber
Standard gauge railways in England